A Safe Place is a 1971 American drama film written and directed by Henry Jaglom and starring Tuesday Weld, Orson Welles, and Jack Nicholson.

Plot
A young woman, named Noah, lives alone in a small apartment New York City.  She is a mentally disturbed flower child, who retreats into her past, yearning for lost innocence. She recalls her childhood, searching for a "safe place."  As a child, whose real birth name was Susan, she met a charismatic magician in Central Park who presented her with magical objects: a levitating silver ball, a star ring, and a Noah's ark.  In the present day, Noah is currently and romantically involved with two totally different men named Fred and Mitch. Fred is practical, but dull. Mitch is dynamic and sexy, her ideal fantasy partner. Neither man is able to totally fulfill her needs.

Cast
The cast includes:
 Tuesday Weld as Susan/Noah
 Orson Welles as The Magician
 Jack Nicholson as Mitch
 Philip Proctor as Fred
 Gwen Welles as Bari
 Roger Garrett as Noah's Friend
 Francesca Hilton as Noah's Friend
 Richard Finocchio as Noah's Friend

Production
The film was "culled from 50 hours of footage."
 
The work was a product of  BBS Productions, a company formed by Bob Rafelson, Bert Schneider, and Steve Blauner, financed by their work on the TV pop group the Monkees. Other BBS films of the era include Easy Rider, Five Easy Pieces, The Last Picture Show, The King of Marvin Gardens, Head, and Drive, He Said. All five of these films have been restored and released in DVD versions by The Criterion Collection in a set called America Lost and Found: The BBS Story.

Reception
Jaglom's directorial debut was a "critical and box-office disaster" Time magazine called the film "pretentious and confusing", a film that "suggests that the rumors of his expertise were greatly exaggerated, or at least that it does not extend to directing."  Vincent Canby described the film as a "superficial case history of a suicide" whose "narrative pretends to be a lot more complex"; Canby noted that the film "reveals the director's apparent adoration of his star [Weld], whom he studies in every possible light and color combination, and in every possible camera setup, often orchestrated with fine, corny songs out of the 1940s and 1950s on the order of Charles Trenet's 'La Mer' and 'Vous Qui Passez Sans Me Voir.'" Variety said the film's "deliberate experimentation puts a heavy burden upon the viewer." Its writer-director "has plunged in over his own depth."

See also
 List of American films of 1971

References

External links 
 

1971 drama films
Films directed by Henry Jaglom
American independent films
American drama films
Films about magic and magicians
1971 films
1971 directorial debut films
1971 independent films
1970s English-language films
1970s American films